Æneas John McIntyre  (6 December 1821 – 19 September 1889) was a Scottish-born  Liberal Party politician who sat in the House of Commons from 1880 to 1885.

Career
Aeneas McIntyre joined the Middle Temple on 6 November 1843 and was called to the bar on 20 November 1846. On 8 February 1872 he was appointed Queen's Counsel and became a Bencher of his Inn on 27 May 1873. He went on the North Wales and Chester circuit and was elected a member of the Bar Committee in December 1883.

At the 1880 general election McIntyre was elected as one of the two Members of Parliament (MPs) for Worcester.
He held the seat until Worcester's representation was reduced to one seat under the Redistribution of Seats Act. At the 1880 general election he stood unsuccessfully in Hackney North.

McIntyre was appointed County Court Judge for circuit No. 12 (Yorkshire) in January 1889.

Personal life
Mclntyre was the only son of Aeneas Mclntyre LL.D. and F.L.S., of King's College, Aberdeen, and Hackney and his wife Charlotte Susanna Thompson, daughter of William Thomson of Jamaica. He married Eleanor Corbett daughter of George Corbett in 1854.

He died nine months after his appointment as a Judge at the age of 67 and is buried in Highgate Cemetery.

References

External links

1821 births
1889 deaths
Burials at Highgate Cemetery
Members of the Middle Temple
Liberal Party (UK) MPs for English constituencies
UK MPs 1880–1885
19th-century King's Counsel
19th-century English judges
Politicians from Worcestershire
County Court judges (England and Wales)